The Besaya valley is both a comarca located in the center of Cantabria, along the course of the Besaya River, and the natural valley of said river. Its capital is Torrelavega.

The Besaya River Basin 
The region annually receives  of precipitation. The Besaya River flows north into the Bay of Biscay. In some stretches of the river, the V-shaped valley and steep slopes lend themselves to dams that generate electricity. The lower sections of the river are prone to flooding.

The Besaya Valley comarca 

The comarca comprises eleven municipalities:

References 

Besaya
Besaya
Green Spain